Whitley Township is located in Moultrie County, Illinois, United States. As of the 2010 census, its population was 660 and it contained 278 housing units.

Geography

Demographics

References

External links
City-data.com
Illinois State Archives

Townships in Moultrie County, Illinois
Townships in Illinois